Tommy Quick (22 July 1955 – 10 November 2013) was a Swedish archer. He competed in the men's individual event at the 1984 Summer Olympics.

References

External links
 

1955 births
2013 deaths
Swedish male archers
Olympic archers of Sweden
Archers at the 1984 Summer Olympics
People from Skövde Municipality
Sportspeople from Västra Götaland County